

England

Head coach: Mike Davis

 Bill Beaumont (c.)
 Phil Blakeway
 Tony Bond
 John Carleton
 Maurice Colclough
 Les Cusworth
 Huw Davies
 Paul Dodge
 Dusty Hare
 Bob Hesford
 Nick Jeavons
 Gary Pearce
 Marcus Rose
 John Scott
 Mike Slemen
 Colin Smart
 Steve Smith
 Jim Syddall
 Peter Wheeler
 Peter Winterbottom
 Clive Woodward

France

Head coach: Jacques Fouroux

 Christian Belascain
 Serge Blanco
 Éric Buchet
 Manuel Carpentier
 Michel Cremaschi
 Philippe Dintrans
 Pierre Dospital
 Michel Fabre
 Serge Gabernet
 Jean-François Imbernon
 Jean-Luc Joinel
 Pierre Lacans
 Jean-Patrick Lescarboura
 Alain Lorieux
 Gérard Martinez
 Patrick Mesny
 Robert Paparemborde
 Laurent Pardo
 Patrick Perrier
 Daniel Revailler
 Jean-Pierre Rives (c.)
 Laurent Rodriguez
 Marc Sallefranque
 Jean-Paul Wolf

Ireland

Head coach: Tom Kiernan

 Ollie Campbell
 Keith Crossan
 Paul Dean
 Willie Duggan 
 Moss Finn
 Ciaran Fitzgerald (c.)
 David Irwin
 Moss Keane
 Ronan Kearney
 Michael Kiernan
 Donal Lenihan
 Hugo MacNeill
 Robbie McGrath
 Ginger McLoughlin
 John Murphy
 John O'Driscoll
 Phil Orr
 Trevor Ringland
 Fergus Slattery

Scotland

Head coach: Jim Telfer

 Jim Aitken
 Roger Baird
 Jim Calder
 Bill Cuthbertson
 Colin Deans
 Gordon Dickinson
 Andy Irvine (c.)
 David Johnston
 Roy Laidlaw
 David Leslie
 Iain Milne
 Eric Paxton
 Iain Paxton
 Jim Renwick
 Keith Robertson
 John Rutherford
 Alan Tomes
 Derek White
 Jim Pollock

Wales

Head coach: John Lloyd

 Rob Ackerman
 Clive Burgess
 Eddie Butler
 Pat Daniels
 Gareth Davies (c.)
 Mark Davies
 Alun Donovan
 Gwyn Evans
 Ray Gravell
 Terry Holmes
 Rhodri Lewis
 Richard Moriarty
 Bob Norster
 Gary Pearce
 Alan Phillips
 Graham Price
 Clive Rees
 David Richards
 Jeff Squire
 Ian Stephens
 Steve Sutton
 Geoff Wheel
 Gareth Williams
 Gerald Williams

External links
1982 Five Nations Championship Statistics

Six Nations Championship squads